Olav Jenssen (born 11 May 1962) is a Norwegian discus thrower.

He was born in Vinje. He finished eleventh at 1981 European Junior Championships and competed at the 1986 European Championships, the 1992 Summer Olympics, the 1995 World Championships, the 1997 World Championships and the 1998 European Championships without reaching the final. He was Norwegian champion in 1987, 1997 and 1998, representing the club IF Urædd except for some seasons in SK Vidar in the mid-1990s.

References

1962 births
Living people
People from Vinje
Norwegian male discus throwers
Olympic athletes of Norway
Athletes (track and field) at the 1992 Summer Olympics
World Athletics Championships athletes for Norway
Sportspeople from Vestfold og Telemark